Inventor of Evil is the ninth studio album by German thrash metal band Destruction, released on August 22, 2005.

Track listing

Credits 
Writing, performance and production credits are adapted from the album's liner notes.

Personnel 
Destruction
 Schmier – bass, lead vocals
 Mike Sifringer – guitars
 Marc Reign – drums, backing vocals

Guest musicians
 Biff Byford – vocals on "The Alliance of Hellhoundz"
 Messiah Marcolin – vocals on "The Alliance of Hellhoundz"
 Peavy Wagner – vocals on "The Alliance of Hellhoundz"
 Doro – vocals on "The Alliance of Hellhoundz"
 Mark Osegueda (Death Angel) – vocals on "The Alliance of Hellhoundz"
 Shagrath – vocals on "The Alliance of Hellhoundz"
 Paul Di'Anno – vocals on "The Alliance of Hellhoundz"
 Peter Tägtgren – vocals on "The Alliance of Hellhoundz"
 Björn "Speed" Strid – vocals on "The Alliance of Hellhoundz"
 Harry Wilkens – guitar solo on "The Alliance of Hellhoundz", "The Chosen Ones", "Seeds of Hate"
 Ferdy Doernberg – guitar solo on "The Alliance of Hellhoundz"
 V.O. Pulver – guitar solo on "The Alliance of Hellhoundz"

Additional musicians
 Messiah Marcolin – additional vocals on "Seeds of Hate"
 Inga Pulver – additional vocals on "Seeds of Hate", backing vocals
 Andre Grieder – additional vocals on "Seeds of Hate", backing vocals
 V.O. Pulver – backing vocals
 Franky Winkelmann – backing vocals
 "Ulle" Uhlmann – backing vocals
 Andy Brooks – backing vocals
 Harry Wilkens – backing vocals
 "Reimo" – backing vocals

Production
 Destruction – production
 Franky Winkelmann – recording, pre-production
 V.O. Pulver – recording
 Peter Tägtgren – recording, mixing
 Daniel "Longiz" – recording
 "Atilla" – recording (Paul Di'Anno vocals only)

Artwork and design
 Gyula Havancsak – cover art
 Katja Piolka – photography
 Dirk Schelpmeier – photography

Studios 
 House of Music Studios, Germany – recording
 Little Creek Studio, Gelterkinden, Switzerland – recording
 Abyss Studios, Pärlby, Sweden – mixing
 Cutting Room, Stockholm, Sweden – mastering

References 

2005 albums
AFM Records albums
Destruction (band) albums